Habenaria dentata is a species of orchid native to the Himalaya, China, India, Indochina, Thailand and Myanmar. It is also found at Phalee. The whole plant is about 35 to 80 cm in height. It has a smooth round tuber that give rise to a single plant.  Lower part of stem sheathed, middle leafy and upper part bracteate. Leaves 4 to 6 cm long, oblong to elliptic, 5 nerved, sometimes 7 also, the base of the leaf narrowed into a long tubular sheath. Spike 4 to 8 cm long, laxly flowered. Sepals sub-equal, broadly ovate, acute, spreading, the lateral pair sub-erect. Petals narrowly oblong, sub-acute, curved inwards, shorter than the sepals. Lip as long as the sepals, variable in breadth, with large cuneate or rounded, fimbriate or crenate side lobes and a small oblong entire apical lobe. Spur infundibuliform at the base, slender laterally compressed, geniculate, sub-clavate below the knee, longer than the shortly stalked beaked ovary. Stigmas separated by the area in the centre by the orifice of the spur. It generally blooms in August- September.

Synonyms
Orchis dentata Sw. is the basionym. Other synonyms include:
Habenaria dentata f. ecalcarata (King & Pantl.) Tuyama
Habenaria dentata ssp. ecalcarata (King & Pantl.) Panigrahi & Murti
Habenaria dentata var. ecalcarata (King & Pantl.) Hand.-Mazz.
Habenaria dentata var. parageniculata (Tang & F.T. Wang) Aver.
Habenaria dentata var. tohoensis (Hayata) S.S. Ying
Habenaria finetiana Schltr.
Habenaria geniculata D.Don
Habenaria geniculata var. ecalcarata King & Pantl.
Habenaria miersiana Champ. ex Benth.
Habenaria miersiana var. yunnanensis Finet
Habenaria parageniculata Tang & F.T. Wang
Habenaria sieboldiana Miq.
Habenaria tienensis Tang & F.T. Wang
Habenaria tohoensis Hayata
Orchis geniculata Buch.-Ham. ex D. Don
Plantaginorchis dentata (Sw.) Szlach.
Plantaginorchis finetiana (Schltr.) Szlach.
Platanthera dentata (Sw.) Lindl.
Platanthera geniculata (D. Don) Lindl. ex Wall.

References

External links
Habenaria dentata on Discover Life

dentata